Arrest and Trial is a 90-minute American crime/legal drama series that ran during the 1963-1964 season on ABC, airing Sundays from 8:30-10 pm Eastern.

Overview
The majority of episodes consists of two segments. Set in Los Angeles, the first part ("The Arrest") followed Detective Sergeants Nick Anderson (Ben Gazzara) and Dan Kirby (Roger Perry) of the Los Angeles Police Department as they tracked down and captured a criminal. The apprehended suspect was then defended in the second part ("The Trial") by criminal attorney John Egan (Chuck Connors), who was often up against Deputy District Attorney Jerry Miller (John Larch) and his assistant, Barry Pine (John Kerr, who later became an actual lawyer).

Gazzara agreed to play the role of Anderson only after extracting a promise from the producer that scripts would avoid stereotypical depictions of police officers.

In a 1963 TV Guide interview, Gazzara described his portrayal of Anderson: "I'm supposed to be a thinking man's cop. I'm a serious student of human behavior, more concerned with what creates the criminal than how to punish him. In other words, I'm not the kind of cop who asks, 'Where were you the night of April 13th?' It's my job to show that there is room for passion and intellectualism and personal display even within a policeman."

Arrest and Trial debuted on September 15, 1963. Its last telecast was on April 19, 1964. On April 24, 1964, it became the first American import to be broadcast on the UK's BBC2.

The same premise was adopted decades later by a more financially successful series, Law & Order, although the second half trial portion is focused on the prosecutorial side for that series, rather than the defense.

Cast
Ben Gazzara as Detective Sgt. Nick Anderson
Chuck Connors as John Egan
Roger Perry as Detective Sgt. Dan Kirby
John Kerr as Barry Pine
John Larch as Deputy D.A. Jerry Miller
Joe Higgins as Jake Shakespeare

Episodes

Guest stars

Nick Adams
Martin Balsam
Richard Basehart
Richard Conte
Broderick Crawford
Francis De Sales
Robert Duvall
Bill Erwin
Peter Fonda
Anne Francis
Billy Gray
Joey Heatherton
Charlene Holt
Dennis Hopper
Kim Hunter
Jack Klugman
Robert Knapp
Dayton Lummis
James MacArthur
Roddy McDowall

Barbara Nichols
Michael Parks
Madlyn Rhue
Chris Robinson
Mickey Rooney
Telly Savalas
Joseph Schildkraut 
George Segal
William Shatner
Martin Sheen
Everett Sloane
Harold J. Stone
Barbara Stuart
Barry Sullivan
Beverly Washburn
Robert Webber
James Whitmore

Awards
Arrest and Trial earned four Emmy nominations in 1964. Two were for Martine Bartlett and Anjanette Comer for Outstanding Performance in a Supporting Role by an Actress, one was for Roddy McDowall for Outstanding Performance in a Supporting Role by an Actor, and the other was for Danny Landres, Milton Shifman and Richard Wray for Outstanding Achievement in Film Editing for Television.

Home media
On November 22, 2011, Timeless Media Group released Arrest and Trial- The Complete Series on DVD in Region 1.  The 10-disc set features all 30 episodes of the series.

See also
 Dragnet (1951–59) – NBC drama series (produced by Jack Webb) that followed the Arrest and Trial format.
 The D.A. (1971–72) – short-lived NBC drama series (produced by Jack Webb) that followed the Arrest and Trial format, and is also owned by NBC Universal.
 Law & Order (1990–2010, 2022-) – NBC drama series (produced by Dick Wolf) that also followed the Arrest and Trial format, and is also owned by NBC Universal.
 Arrest & Trial (2000) – syndicated docudrama series also produced by Wolf

References
 Durslag, Melvin. (1963, October 12–18). The Egghead Flatfoot. TV Guide, pp. 8–11.

Footnotes

External links

 

1963 American television series debuts
1964 American television series endings
1960s American crime drama television series
American Broadcasting Company original programming
American legal drama television series
Black-and-white American television shows
English-language television shows
Fictional portrayals of the Los Angeles Police Department
Television series by Universal Television
Television shows set in Los Angeles